The Batalha dos Aflitos (English: Battle of the Afflicted) is a name used by the Brazilian press to refer to a memorable Campeonato Brasileiro Série B play-off match played on Saturday, 26 November 2005 between Náutico and Grêmio. The name, Batalha dos Aflitos, is used in reference to Náutico's stadium, the Estádio dos Aflitos, in the city of Recife, where the match was played and also to the enormous tension demonstrated by both clubs during the game, hence the term, Batalha (English: Battle).
The eventual winners, in the occasion Grêmio, would be promoted to the Campeonato Brasileiro Série A in 2006.

Background
In 2005, Grêmio, historically one of the greatest football clubs in Brazil, was going through a difficult time playing in the second division of Brazilian football, following crippling financial problems and a traumatic Série A 2004 campaign, in which they came last and 11 points behind the next relegated team. In the Série B final game, Grêmio faced Náutico, a very popular club in the Brazilian northeast, based in Recife. Náutico hoped to return to the Série A, the main division of Brazilian Championship, after 11 frustrating years. Náutico, playing at home, believed that their long-awaited dream was finally going to come true.

The final round of the 2005 Série B Championship was played by the 4 best teams in the division. All teams played against each other, both home and away, in a mini round robin tournament. The winner and runner-up were promoted to Brazil's Série A, the country's main professional football division.

With one last game to be played, in the sixth round of the home and away round robin tournament, Grêmio was leading the standings with 9 points, with Santa Cruz (which, like Náutico, is also from Recife) in second place with 7 points, and Náutico in third with 6 points. Portuguesa, from São Paulo, was last with only 5. The last two games of the qualification tournament were played simultaneously. So as Grêmio faced Náutico, 
Santa Cruz faced Portuguesa. A victory for Náutico would ensure promotion to the Série A and, as long as Santa Cruz won their match, would keep Grêmio, a struggling Brazilian giant, in the Série B. Fate would have it that their final game would join the rich pages of Brazilian football legend.

Summary
From kick-off, the match was tense. Grêmio were playing a defensive strategy. Not only they were playing away from home, but they were taking advantage of their better position on the table and so the fact that they would qualify to Série A with a draw. The best chance of the first half came when Náutico was awarded a penalty kick by the referee, but Bruno Carvalho missed it, hitting the right post, with Grêmio's goalkeeper totally defeated.

The game was 0–0, but at the beginning of the second half the atmosphere was even more tense and, at times, violent. On the other qualifying match, Santa Cruz had scored a second goal and were now leading 2–1. Grêmio was losing the first position in the group, but would still be promoted to the main division with a draw. The locals, Náutico, still needed to win to qualify to Série A at the expense of Grêmio.

The match kept a tense, intense pace, with Náutico seeking a goal and Grêmio holding back, hoping that the talent of Anderson, who later would play for Manchester United, for some magic goal in a counter-attack. 10 minutes into the second half, Grêmio's Escalona received a red card following a handball, leaving Grêmio with 10 players. Náutico smelled blood and went on the attack, while Grêmio players hoped to hold on for a draw. What was an intense, but normal football game became a memorable battle when 34:54 minutes into the second half, a dubious second penalty was given against Grêmio. The referee penalized and sent off Nunes for a handball inside the area, leaving Grêmio with 9 players.

Grêmio players' emotions ran high and a chaotic situation ensued, in which Grêmio players surrounded the referee, complaining aggressively of his second penalty and second red decisions. Chaos stopped the match for about 25 minutes. As a result of this chaotic situation and some aggressive arguing by some Grêmio players, the referee showed two more red cards, sending off two additional Grêmio players; the defender Domingos and the right-back Patrício. Grêmio was down to seven men.

It seemed to be the end of Grêmio's hopes of a return to Série A. Náutico had a penalty kick and 11 players on the field. Grêmio faced a second penalty against, and had only seven players left, the goal keeper and six outfield players. The situation had made the match tremendously tense, in and out of the pitch. Players from both teams were feeling the pressure. Initially no Náutico player wanted to take the second penalty. Eventually left wing Ademar took it, at 59:45, after near 25 minutes of interruption. Grêmio's goalkeeper Galatto narrowly saved a second penalty, with his feet, sending the ball over the goal for a corner kick, also sending both the Grêmio and Náutico followers into a nervous frenzy.

At this point, because of the chaotic 25-minute delay in the match, the other qualifying game had already finished with a 2–1 victory by Santa Cruz; which at the moment were Série B Champions and had also ensured qualification to Série A, taking one of the only two available qualifying spots.

The second saved penalty had kept the score level, 0–0, but Grêmio, playing as visitors with seven men, still had to hold off a full Náutico squad for about 10 additional minutes. All observers of the game surely thought such was simply impossible!

Fate had it that following the second doomed penalty, Náutico's corner kick resulted in Grêmio's star player Anderson gaining control of the ball in an excellent position. He began a quick, dangerous counterattack which was stopped with an aggressive foul by Náutico's defender Batata. Batata received a second yellow card and was sent off, leaving his team with 10 men. Taking advantage of a momentary lapse in concentration by Náutico's defense, Grêmio's Marcelo Costa astutely played the free kick to Anderson who entered Náutico's area, passed two defenders who appeared scared of touching him, and scored an incredibly unlikely goal. 1-0 Grêmio, at 61:20.

For the next 8 minutes, the visitors Grêmio, with 7 men, against all odds held off a nervous 10 men Náutico, till the final whistle at 69:45. Anderson's goal, scored 95 seconds after Náutico missed their second penalty of the match, gained Grêmio the Série B title and, most importantly, promotion back to the Série A. Following the Batalha dos Aflitos, in 2007 Grêmio would reach the final of the Copa Libertadores.

Details

Curiosities

 Grêmio revealed important names for international football after this match. Both substitutes that entered the match in the second half have played or are playing in the top tier of English football: Anderson with the nickname "Andershow" was noticed by FC Porto of Portugal and then played for seven and a half seasons at Manchester United. Lucas Leiva also played at the Premier League for Liverpool. Grêmio's coach Mano Menezes became the manager of the Brazilian national team from 2010 until 2012.
 The "Batalha dos Aflitos" was so memorable to Grêmio fans that a documentary was made about it. "Inacreditável - A Batalha dos Aflitos" was released in 2007 and tells the story of that year's championship, focusing on the 71 seconds between Náutico's second penalty and the decisive goal.

References

External links
Text at uol (Portuguese)
Text at globo.com (Portuguese)

2005 in Brazilian football
Clube Náutico Capibaribe matches
Grêmio Foot-Ball Porto Alegrense matches
Nicknamed sporting events